Danielle Woodhouse  (born 23 January 1969 in Perth) is an Australian water polo player from the gold medal squad of the 2000 Summer Olympics. She is the sister of Bridgette Ireland (Gusterson) who was captain of the 2000 Olympic Team. Along with Liz Weekes, Woodhouse was the goal keeper for the Australian team in 2000. Danielle is a Sports Physiotherapist working with elite water polo players residing in Perth with her husband and 2 children.

See also
 Australia women's Olympic water polo team records and statistics
 List of Olympic champions in women's water polo
 List of Olympic medalists in water polo (women)
 List of women's Olympic water polo tournament goalkeepers
 List of World Aquatics Championships medalists in water polo

References

External links
 

1969 births
Living people
Sportspeople from Perth, Western Australia
Sportswomen from Western Australia
Australian female water polo players
Water polo goalkeepers
Olympic gold medalists for Australia in water polo
Water polo players at the 2000 Summer Olympics
Medalists at the 2000 Summer Olympics
Recipients of the Medal of the Order of Australia
Australian physiotherapists